David A. Millage (born February 26, 1953) is an American politician in the state of Iowa.

Millage was born in Portland, Oregon and attended the University of Iowa. A Republican, he served in the Iowa House of Representatives from 1991 to 2003 (41st district from 1993 to 2003, 40th district from 1991 to 1993).

In January 2021, Millage, who had served as the Scott County Republican chairman, was forced out of this role after he had supported impeaching Donald Trump following the 2021 storming of the United States Capitol.

Personal
As of 2021, Millage resides in Bettendorf.

References

1953 births
Living people
Politicians from Portland, Oregon
Iowa lawyers
Republican Party members of the Iowa House of Representatives
20th-century American politicians
21st-century American politicians
University of Iowa alumni
Lawyers from Portland, Oregon